Rose Lake is a lake in Martin County, in the U.S. state of Minnesota.

Rose Lake was named for the abundance of wild roses near the lake.

See also
List of lakes in Minnesota

References

Lakes of Minnesota
Lakes of Martin County, Minnesota